NGC 1210 is a barred lenticular galaxy located in the constellation Fornax, about 179 million light-years from the Milky Way. It was discovered by the American astronomer Ormond Stone in 1885.

See also 
 List of NGC objects (1001–2000)

References 

1210
Barred lenticular galaxies
Shell galaxies
Fornax (constellation)
011666